Meesia is a genus of mosses belonging to the family Meesiaceae. The genus has cosmopolitan distribution.

The genus name of Meesia is in honour of David Meese (1723–1770), who was a Dutch botanist, notable for his authorship of the Flora frisica in 1760.

The genus was first described by Johann Hedwig in 1801.

Species
As accepted by GBIF;
Meesia hexasticha (Funck) Bruch
Meesia lavardei Thér.
Meesia longiseta Hedwig, 1801
Meesia muelleri Müll. Hal. & Hampe
Meesia novae-zealandia Dixon & Sainsbury
Meesia squarrosa (Hedw.) Wahlenb.
Meesia stygia (Sw.) Brid.
Meesia triquetra (Richt.) Ångstr.
Meesia ulei Müll. Hal.
Meesia uliginosa Hedw.
Meesia vagans (Hook. & Wilson) Müll. Hal.

References

Splachnales
Moss genera